Voorhees Town Center (formerly Echelon Mall) is a regional shopping mall and a residential area located in Voorhees Township, New Jersey. It was built in 1970 and named after Echelon Airfield which was located where the mall stands today. The Echelon Mall was renamed Voorhees Town Center in 2007. Boscov's currently serves as the only anchor of the mall.

Property history
The Echelon Airfield was incorporated in 1944 and went on to house twenty planes. The development included three grass runways, a gift shop, a small café and hangar capable of housing six planes. The airfield was mostly used for recreational flying, flying lessons, and a take-off point for crop dusters and chartered flights.

In 1950 Rogers Smith died in an airplane accident. His wife leased the airfield to Hugh and Kay Hamill, who operated it until she sold the property in 1962.  The new owners renamed the field Delaware Valley Airpark, and ran it for three more years.  In 1969, groundbreaking occurred to construct the Echelon Mall, which was the centerpiece of a 470-acre planned community named "Echelon" consisting of apartments, condominiums, single-family homes, office space, and civic space that included a YMCA, and the new Camden County Library. Developed by The Rouse Company, the mall opened in 1970.

Mall history 

This made it the second largest mall in southern New Jersey after the Cherry Hill Mall. Echelon was developed in 1970 at the center of a residential and commercial center in Voorhees. In October 1992, the Echelon Mall housed a family entertainment center called Exhilarama, which was owned and operated by Edison Brothers Stores. Exhilarama was a popular indoor amusement center throughout the mid-1990s until it closed in 1996. The Exhilarama center had a General Cinema movie theater, which also closed a few years later. The building was demolished and the land was used to provide parking for the mall.

Decline 

Echelon was a popular mall up until around 2000, when the mall began to struggle, and by 2005, the vacancy rate was nearly 75%. Echelon had several problems that contributed to its high vacancy rate, including over expansion.  It had four anchors which included Sears, built in 1998 but closed three years later. The remainder of the mall lacked renovations. JCPenney exited shortly after Sears, with the national chains gradually following suit. Much of the upper level is vacant, most noticeably in the section near Macy's.

Numerous other malls are located nearby, including Cherry Hill Mall and moderately-sized malls in Moorestown and Deptford. While Echelon competed with these centers for years, the advent of newer centers such as The Promenade at Sagemore in Marlton, and a significant renovation of the Deptford Mall, with the addition of a JCPenney, have provided more attractive shopping alternatives in the area. Also, whereas most U.S. shopping malls are located near an Interstate highway or at least a principal thoroughfare, Echelon is located at the intersection of Somerdale and Burnt Mill Roads in Voorhees.

In August 2021, Brooklyn Pizza, formerly Lorenzo's Pizza and Scotto's Pizza, was the final eatery to close inside the mall. The food court is now vacant. Also in August, LensCrafters moved to The Promenade at Sagemore. It had been operating in the mall since the early 1980s.

First redevelopment plans

PREIT renovated the downsized mall to house  of small specialty shops along with anchor stores Macy's and Boscov's.

The mall was officially renamed as Voorhees Town Center. The groundbreaking ceremony on the redevelopment project was on January 30, 2007. The former Sears and JCPenney buildings, and the mall corridor between Macy's and the former JCPenney were demolished.

In December 2007, work was completed on the mall portion of the town center. Condos and new office complexes were also built around the same time. In spring 2008, the Voorhees Town Center held its grand opening. In May 2011, the Voorhees Township municipal offices relocated to the town center. According to PREIT, the Voorhees Town Center is only the third mall in the United States to be anchored by municipal offices.

Future redevelopment 
In October 2015, PREIT sold the Voorhees Town Center for $13.4 million to Namdar Realty Group after Macy's announced the closure of 36 unspecified stores. However, when Macy's later released a statement announcing the stores to be closed, Voorhees Town Center was not mentioned.

On January 4, 2017, it was announced that Macy's would be closing in spring 2017 as part of a plan to close 68 stores nationwide which left Boscov's as the only remaining anchor.

Throughout 2017 and 2018, many national merchants left the struggling mall.  At the time, the vacancy rate at the mall was 40 percent.

In March 2018, Voorhees Township officials moved forward with a plan that declared the mall a "redevelopment area" proposing that parts of the mall face eminent domain. The plan called for the township acquiring most of the mall and the shuttered Macy's anchor store for redevelopment.

By June 2018, the town began accepting offers from potential redevelopers to prevent an eminent domain situation.  Some of the proposed ideas included "adding microbreweries and making it more like an Xfinity Live-type atmosphere or like a Dave & Buster's."

By September 2018, township officials had selected Brandywine Financial Services Corp. to "transform the largely vacant mall into a mixed-use center with housing and entertainment attractions." Township officials indicated that some parts of the mall may be razed during the redevelopment.

By January 2019, plans began to solidify further, which "includes beer courts instead of food courts, laser tag, sports bars and outdoor movie nights when weather permits." Also included in the plan are more town homes and apartments that could be built in and around the former Macy's.

Anchors
 Boscov's (opened 1990); formerly Stern's

Former anchors
 Stern's (opened 1986; closed 1990); formerly Gimbels, now Boscov's
 Gimbels (opened 1977; closed 1986); formerly Lit Brothers
Lit Brothers (opened 1970; closed 1977); original anchor
 Macy's (opened 2006; closed 2017), formerly Strawbridge's
Strawbridge's (opened 1970; closed 2006); original anchor
 JCPenney (opened 1976; closed 2003; vacant 2003–2007; demolished 2007)
 Sears (opened 1998; closed 2001; vacant 2001–2007; demolished 2007)

References

External links

 Voorhees Town Center website
 PREIT press release
 International Council of Shopping Centers: Echelon Mall

Buildings and structures in Camden County, New Jersey
Shopping malls in New Jersey
Shopping malls established in 1970
Voorhees Township, New Jersey
1970 establishments in New Jersey
Namdar Realty Group